Carle Place (previously known as Carll Place) is a station along the Main Line of the Long Island Rail Road (LIRR). It is served by trains on the Port Jefferson Branch at all times while most Ronkonkoma Branch trains and all Montauk Branch trains bypass the station. It is located at Cherry Lane and Atlantic Avenue in Carle Place, New York.

History 

Carle Place was built on March 1, 1837 with the opening of the LIRR to Hicksville. The station was closed sometime in 1859, however it was revived in 1923 as a sheltered shed. The station has existed as a pair of platformed shelters ever since then. In October 1970, the electrification of the Port Jefferson Branch between Mineola and Huntington Stations was completed.

As part of the Main Line third track project, the Carle Place station was upgraded to accommodate full-length 12-car trains. Canopies, benches, signage, and security cameras were installed. The station was made compliant with the Americans with Disabilities Act of 1990 via the installation of elevators and ramps, as well as the replacement of the existing overpass. Amenities such as Wi-Fi, USB charging stations, artwork, and digital information displays were included in the renovation. The electrical substation at Carle Place station was replaced to make way for the third track.

Station layout
This station has two high-level side platforms, each 12 cars long. During rush hours, trains stop at both platforms in the peak direction. Some Port Jefferson Branch trains, most Ronkonkoma Branch trains, and all Montauk Branch trains pass through the station without stopping.

Both platforms have staircase going down to Cherry Lane and Atlantic Avenue on their extreme west end. At their center, the eastbound platform has a staircase and ramp that connects to a pedestrian walkway to Garden Avenue, while the westbound platform has two short ramps leading to the dead-end of Stonehinge Lane. The station's only two ticket vending machines are here under a green kiosk. A steel overpass connects the platforms at this point. On the extreme east end, the eastbound platform has a staircase going to the dead-end of Carle Road.

In March 2019, both platforms had their western halves demolished from Cherry Lane to the pedestrian overpass as part of the Third Track Project. This temporarily left the station with two platforms, six cars long from the pedestrian overpass to Carle Road.

References

External links 

 Cherry Lane entrance from Google Maps Street View
 Platforms from Google Maps Street View

Carle Place, New York
Long Island Rail Road stations in Nassau County, New York
Railway stations in the United States opened in 1837